This article presents a list of the historical events and publications of Australian literature during 1977.

Events 
 Ruth Park won the 1977 Miles Franklin Award for Swords and Crowns and Rings

Major publications

Books 
 Jon Cleary – High Road to China (novel)
 Helen Garner – Monkey Grip
 Colleen McCullough – The Thorn Birds
 Ruth Park – Swords and Crowns and Rings

Short stories 
 Frank Moorhouse – Tales of Mystery and Romance

Science fiction and fantasy 
 A. Bertram Chandler:
The Far Traveller
Star Courier
 Lee Harding — The Weeping Sky
 David Lake:
The Right Hand of Dextra
The Wildings of Westron

Children's and young adult fiction 
 Joan Phipson – Fly into Danger
 Eleanor Spence – A Candle for St. Antony 
 Patricia Wrightson – The Ice Is Coming

Poetry 
 Robert Adamson – Cross The Border
 Nancy Keesing – Hails and Farewells
 Jennifer Maiden – Mortal Details
 Les Murray – Ethnic Radio
 John Tranter – Crying in Early Infancy: 100 Sonnets
 Chris Wallace-Crabbe – The Emotions Are Not Skilled Workers

Drama 
 Dorothy Hewett – The Golden Oldies
 Peter Kenna
 Mates
 Trespassers Will Be Prosecuted
 Louis Nowra – Inner Voices
 Patrick White – Big Toys
 David Williamson – The Club

Non-fiction 
 Blanche d'Alpuget – Mediator: A biography of Sir Richard Kirby
 Zelda D'Aprano – Zelda: The becoming of a woman
 Fred Daly – From Curtin to Kerr
 John Edwards – Life Wasn't Meant to Be Easy: A political profile of Malcolm Fraser
 Paul Hasluck – Mucking About: An Autobiography

Awards and honours

Order of Australia
 Eleanor Dark appointed Officer of the Order of Australia (AO) 
 Colin Thiele appointed Companion of the Order of Australia (AC)

Lifetime achievement

Literary

Children and Young Adult

Poetry

Births 
A list, ordered by date of birth (and, if the date is either unspecified or repeated, ordered alphabetically by surname) of births in 1977 of Australian literary figures, authors of written works or literature-related individuals follows, including year of death.

 7 August — Patrick Holland, novelist and short story writer

Unknown date
 Jennifer Mills — novelist, short story writer and poet

Deaths 
A list, ordered by date of death (and, if the date is either unspecified or repeated, ordered alphabetically by surname) of deaths in 1977 of Australian literary figures, authors of written works or literature-related individuals follows, including year of birth.

 10 July – Alec Chisholm, journalist, ornithologist and encyclopaedist (born 1890)
 22 August – Leon Gellert, poet (born 1892)
 2 September – Pat Flower, playwright, television scriptwriter and crime novelist (born 1914)
 12 September – Les Haylen, politician, playwright, novelist and journalist (born 1898)

See also 
 1977 in Australia
 1977 in literature
 1977 in poetry
 List of years in Australian literature
 List of years in literature

References

 
Australian literature by year
20th-century Australian literature
1977 in literature